Jack Sebastian Wakely (born 25 October 2000) is an English professional footballer who plays for Wycombe Wanderers, as a defender.

Career
Jack began his career at Chelsea at under-9 level, turning professional in 2017. He moved on loan to Basingstoke Town in January 2019, and to Brighton & Hove Albion in February 2021. He left Chelsea in the summer of 2021, signing with Wycombe Wanderers in July 2021. On 25 March 2022, Wakely joined National League side Maidenhead United on loan for the remainder of the 2021–22 season.

Career statistics

References

2000 births
Living people
English footballers
Chelsea F.C. players
Basingstoke Town F.C. players
Brighton & Hove Albion F.C. players
Wycombe Wanderers F.C. players
Maidenhead United F.C. players
Association football defenders
National League (English football) players
Southern Football League players